

See also 
 Lists of fossiliferous stratigraphic units in Europe
 List of fossiliferous stratigraphic units in Norway
 List of fossiliferous stratigraphic units in Sweden
 List of fossiliferous stratigraphic units in Germany

References 
 

 Denmark
 
 
Fossiliferous stratigraphic units